The Battle of Eperjes (present day Prešov, Slovakia) was fought on August 11, 1685, near the city of Eperjes in the Kingdom of Hungary, between the forces of the Ottoman Empire, and the forces of the Habsburg monarchy as part of the Great Turkish War.

The Habsburg army defeated the invading forces of Imre Thököly.

References 

Eperjes
Eperjes
17th century in Hungary
Eperjes
Eperjes
Kingdom of Hungary
Slovakia under Habsburg rule
Hungary under Habsburg rule
Prešov
1685 in the Ottoman Empire
1685 in the Habsburg monarchy